Lee Mays Jr. (born September 18, 1978) is a former professional American football wide receiver who played for the Pittsburgh Steelers of the National Football League (NFL). He was part of their Super Bowl XL championship team over the Seattle Seahawks.

Personal
His parents are Lee Mays Sr. and Mary Williams.

High school years
Mays attended Westfield High School in Houston, Texas and was a letterman in football and track. In football, he garnered First-team All-District honors as a senior, and Honorable Mention All-District honors as a junior.

College years

National Football League career
He was selected by the Pittsburgh Steelers with the 202nd pick in the sixth round of the 2002 NFL Draft out of the University of Texas-El Paso. Also known as "ODB/Dirt McGurt" (Popular hip hop Monikers) in four seasons with the Steelers, Mays recorded 11 receptions for 154 yards [14.0 avg.], a longest catch of 46 yards and 0 touchdowns.  He also returned 36 kickoffs for 750 yards, a 20.8 average, a long of 35 yards, and no touchdowns or 40-yard returns. He did not see any playing time in the Steelers Super Bowl run. He was released by the Steelers after training camp on September 1, 2006 but was re-signed  following the release of running back Duce Staley only to be released again due to the team signing Quincy Morgan.

Post-NFL career
He briefly served as color commentator for the now-defunct professional indoor football team the El Paso Generals when the team played at home. Today, he is a Manager at a boutique  hotel in the Houston museum district  area.

See also
 List of NCAA major college football yearly receiving leaders

References

1978 births
Living people
American football wide receivers
Pittsburgh Steelers players
Players of American football from Houston
UTEP Miners football players